The  is a facility affiliated with Kagoshima University in Kagoshima, Kagoshima Prefecture, Japan for the collection, preservation, research, display, and educational use of the various materials generated and acquired by the University. It was established in 2001 as the seventh museum attached to a national university. The reinforced concrete permanent exhibition hall, which dates to 1928 and originally functioned as a book store for the library of the former , was restored in 2003 before reopening in its current guise the following year; it is a Registered Tangible Cultural Property. The display on the lower floor is of archaeological, historical, and cultural materials, while that on the upper floor is of geological specimens, fossils, and other natural history-related exhibits. The collection totals over 1,350,000 items.

See also
 Reimeikan, Kagoshima Prefectural Center for Historical Material
 Kagoshima City Museum of Art

References

External links
  Kagoshima University Museum
  Kagoshima University Museum Vascular Plants Database

Buildings and structures in Kagoshima
Museums in Kagoshima Prefecture
Museums established in 2001
2001 establishments in Japan
University museums in Japan